The Animals & Society Institute (ASI) is an American non-profit scholarly organization that works to expand knowledge about human-animal relationships, develop knowledge and resources in the field of human-animal studies (HAS), and create resources to address the relationship between animal cruelty and other forms of violence.

Personnel and advisors
The ASI is staffed by Ivy Collier (Executive Director), Lisa Lunghofer (Human-Animal Relationships Program Director), Gala Argent (Human-Animal Studies Program Director) and Daniel Earle (managing director). It has a board made up of John Thompson (chair), Anne Elizabeth Hirky (vice chair), Kenneth Shapiro (president and secretary), Petra Pepellashi (treasurer), Beatrice Friedlander, Kristin Stewart, Elan Abrell, and Gail Luciani.

Publications 
The ASI publishes three journals and a book series.

Journal of Applied Animal Welfare Science
The Journal of Applied Animal Welfare Science is a quarterly journal which is published by Taylor & Francis with sponsorship from the ASI. It has been publishing since 1999, and is presently edited by Kenneth J. Shapiro.

Society & Animals
Society & Animals: Journal of Human-Animal Studies is a peer reviewed bi-monthly journal co-published by Brill with sponsorship from the ASI. It has been publishing since 1993, and its founding and current editor is Kenneth Shapiro. The journal is in its 26th year and currently publishes 6 issues per volume. In 2017, S&A received 81,000 full text downloads.

Special sections that have appeared in Society & Animals include Animal Theory and Political Animal. Special issues that the journal has published include:

1996 (4:2): Consumer Psychology
1997 (5:3): Animal Cruelty
1998 (6:2): Geography
1999 (7:2): Children
2000 (8:3): Religion
2001 (9:3): Representation
2005 (13:1): Ways of Seeing

2006 (14:1): Language
2011 (19:4): Proceeding of Minding Animals Conference
2012 (20:2): ASI Fellowship
2013 (21:2): Archaeology
2013 (21:5): Religious Slaughter
2014 (22:1): Animals in Place
2019  (27:7) The Silent Majority: Invertebrates

Sloth
Sloth: A Journal of Emerging Voices in Human-Animal Studies is a bi-annual peer-reviewed journal for work by current and recent undergraduates that has been published by the ASI since 2015. Its current editor is the philosopher Joel MacClellan.

HAS Book Series
The HAS Book Series is published by Brill, and was one of the first academic book series focused on animal studies. It is edited by Kenneth Shapiro, with an editorial board made up of Ralph Acampora, Hilda Kean, Randy Malamud, Gail Melson and Leslie Irvine. As of 2016, it has published 18 volumes, including both monographs and edited collections. Titles published to date:

Lyle Munro, Confronting Cruelty: Moral Orthodoxy and the Challenge of the Animal Rights Movement. 2005
Ann Herda-Rapp and Theresa L. Goedek (eds.), Mad About Wildlife: Looking at Social Conflict Over Wildlife . 2005
Lisa Kemmerer, In Search of Consistency: Ethics, Animas, and the Minimize Harm Maxim. 2006
Laurence Simmons and Philip Armstrong (eds.), Knowing Animals. 2007
Sandra Swart and Lance van Sittert (eds.), Canis Africanis: A Dog History of South Africa. 2008
Tom Tyler and Manuela Rossini (eds.), Animal Encounters. 2009
Terry Caesar, Speaking of Animals: Essays on Dogs and Others.  2009
Sarah E. McFarland and Ryan Hediger (eds.), Animals and Agency. 2010
Carol Freeman, Paper Tiger: A Visual History of the Thylacine. 2010
John Knight, Herding Monkeys to Paradise: How Macaque Troops are Managed for Tourism in Japan. 2011
Nik Taylor and Tania Signal (eds.), Theorizing Animals: Rethinking Humanimal Relations. 2011

Rob Boddice, Anthropocentrism: Humans, Animals, Environments. 2011
Abel A. Alves, The Animals of Spain: An Introduction to Imperial Perceptions and Human Interaction with Other Animals, 1492-1826. 2011
Lynda Birke and Jo Hockenhull (eds.), Crossing Boundaries. 2012
Ryan Hediger, Animals and War. 2012
Nik Taylor and Lindsay Hamilton, Animals at Work. 2013
Annie Potts (ed.), Meat Culture. 2016
Matthew Chrulew and Dinesh Joseph Wadiwel (eds.), Foucault and Animals. 2017
Carmen Cusack, Fish, Justice, and Society. 2018
Justyna Wlodarczyk, Genealogy of Obedience: Reading North American Dog Training Literature, 1850s-2000s. 2018
Anna Barcz and Dorota Łagodzka (eds.), Animals and Their People: Connecting East and West in Critical Animal Studies. 2018
Kathrin Herrmann and Kimberley Jayne (eds.). Animal Experimentation: Working Towards a Paradigm Change. 2019
Judith Benz-Schwarzburg, Cognitive Kin, Moral Strangers? Linking Animal Cognition, Animal Ethics & Animal Welfare. 2019

References

Further reading

External links 
 Official site
 Guide to the Animal Rights Network Records 1903-2003
 Guide to the Animal Rights and Animal Welfare Publications 1896-2018
 Guide to the Animal Rights Network Oral History Collection 1999-2002
 Guide to the Psychologists for the Ethical Treatment of Animals Records 1926-2013

Organizations based in Ann Arbor, Michigan
Animal research institutes
Educational institutions established in 1983
Research institutes established in 1983
1983 establishments in Michigan